Patoki Małe  is a village in the administrative district of Gmina Działoszyn, Pajęczno County, Łódź Voivodeship, Poland.

References

Villages in Pajęczno County